Marinus van der Lubbe (13 January 1909 – 10 January 1934) was a Dutch communist who was tried, convicted, and unconstitutionally executed by the Nazis for allegedly setting fire to the German Reichstag building on 27 February 1933. During his trial, the prosecution argued that van der Lubbe had acted on behalf of a wider Communist conspiracy, while left-wing anti-Nazis argued that the fire was a false flag attack engineered by the Nazis themselves. Most historians agree that van der Lubbe acted alone. Nearly 75 years after the event, the German government granted van der Lubbe a posthumous pardon.

Early life 
Marinus van der Lubbe was born in Leiden in the province of South Holland. His parents were divorced, and after his mother died when he was twelve years old, he went to live with his half-sister's family. In his youth, van der Lubbe worked as a bricklayer. He was nicknamed Dempsey after boxer Jack Dempsey because of his great strength. While working, van der Lubbe came in contact with the labour movement; in 1925, at age 16, he joined the Communist Party of the Netherlands (CPN) and its youth wing, the Communist Youth Bund (CJB).

In 1926 he was injured at work, getting lime in his eyes, which hospitalised him for a few months and almost left him blind. Since the injury forced him to quit his job, he was unemployed with a pension of 7.44 guilders a week. After a few conflicts with his sister, van der Lubbe moved to Leiden in 1927. There he learned to speak some German and founded the Lenin House, where he organised political meetings. While working for the Tielmann factory, a strike broke out. Van der Lubbe claimed to the management to be one of the ringleaders and offered to accept any punishment if no one else was victimised, even though he was clearly too inexperienced to have been seriously involved. During the trial, he tried to claim sole responsibility and was purportedly hostile to the idea of getting off free.

Afterwards, van der Lubbe planned to emigrate to the Soviet Union, but he lacked the funds to do so. He was politically active among the unemployed workers' movement until 1931, when he fell into disagreement with the CPN and instead approached the Group of International Communists. In 1933, van der Lubbe fled to Germany to take action in the local communist underground. He had a criminal record for several attempted arsons.

Reichstag fire 

On 27 February 1933, van der Lubbe was arrested in the Reichstag building, shortly after the building had caught fire. Van der Lubbe confessed and claimed to have acted alone and have set the Reichstag building on fire in an attempt to rally German workers against fascist rule. 

He was brought to trial along with the head of the Communist Party of Germany and three members of the Bulgarian Communist Party, who were working in Germany for the Communist International. At his trial, van der Lubbe was convicted and sentenced to death for the Reichstag fire. The four other defendants (Ernst Torgler, Georgi Dimitrov, Blagoy Popov, and Vasil Tanev) were acquitted. Van der Lubbe was guillotined in a Leipzig prison yard on 10 January 1934, three days before his 25th birthday. He was buried in an unmarked grave on the Südfriedhof (South Cemetery) in Leipzig.

After World War II, moves were made by his brother, Jan van der Lubbe, in an attempt to overturn the original verdict. In 1967, his sentence was changed by a judge from death to eight years in prison. In 1980, after more lengthy complaints, a West German court overturned the verdict entirely, but that was criticised by the state prosecutor. The case was re-examined by the Federal Court of Justice of Germany for three years. In 1983, the court made a final decision on the matter and overturned the result of the 1980 trial on grounds that there was no basis for it and so it was illegal. However, on 6 December 2007 the Attorney General of Germany Monika Harms nullified the entire verdict and posthumously pardoned Van der Lubbe, based on a 1998 German law that makes it possible to overturn certain cases of Nazi injustice. The court's determination was based on the premise that the National Socialist regime was, by definition, unjust, and since the case's death sentence had been politically motivated, it was likely to have contained an extension of that injustice. The conclusion was independent of the factual question of whether or not Van der Lubbe had actually set the fire.

Claimed responsibility 

Historians disagree as to whether van der Lubbe acted alone, as he said, to protest the condition of the German working class, or was involved in a larger conspiracy. The Nazis blamed a communist conspiracy. Responsibility for the Reichstag fire remains an ongoing topic of debate and research in modern historical scholarship. William Shirer, writing in The Rise and Fall of the Third Reich, surmised that Van der Lubbe was goaded into setting a fire at the Reichstag but that the Nazis had set their own more elaborate fire at the same time. According to Ian Kershaw, writing in 1998, the consensus of nearly all historians is that Van der Lubbe had in fact set the Reichstag on fire.

Lex van der Lubbe 
"Lex van der Lubbe" is the colloquial term for the Nazi law on the imposition and execution of the death penalty, passed on 29 March 1933. The name comes from the fact that the law formed the legal basis for the imposition of the death penalty against Van der Lubbe.

The Reichstag Fire Decree of 28 February 1933 contained a list of crimes for which the death penalty was to be imposed instead of a life sentence, as was previously the case. The law on the imposition and execution of the death penalty was passed by the Hitler government on 29 March (on the basis of the Enabling Act which had been passed on 23 March 1933). It extended the law retrospectively to 31 January 1933, thereby violating Article 116 of the Weimar Constitution, which prohibited retroactive penalties. The Enabling Act itself, however, made this legislating constitutional, provided the office of the president and the Reichstag and Reichsrat were not affected. It could thus be applied to Van der Lubbe, who had admitted in court that he had set fire to the Reichstag on 27 February.

The law was ultimately repealed by the Allied Control Council on 30 January 1946 through Control Council Act No. 11.

Exhumation 
In January 2023, parts of Lubbe's body were exhumed. This was done to ascertain the precise location and identity of the grave, as well as to allow for a toxicological analysis. Lubbe had appeared sleepy and apathetic during his trial, giving rise to suspicions that he had been drugged.

References

Other sources 
 Biography Marinus van der Lubbe on libcom.org history.
 Martin Schouten: Rinus van der Lubbe 1909–1934 – een biografie. De Bezige Bij, Amsterdam 1986.(in Dutch)
 Alexander Bahar and Wilfried Kugel: Der Reichstagbrand, edition q (2001) German language only.
 Hersch Fischler: Zum Zeitablauf der Reichstagsbrandstiftung. Korrekturen der Untersuchung Alfred Berndts, in: Vierteljahrshefte für Zeitgeschichte 55 (2005), S. 617–632. (with English summary)

External links 
 
 English translation of The Reichstag Fire (1963) by Fritz Tobias, with introduction by A. J. P. Taylor
 Dutch Council Communism and Van der Lubbe Burning the Reichstag – The question of "exemplary acts" – the political repercussions of his act on his comrades.
 Zuidenwind Filmproductions at www.zuidenwind.nl Documentary about Marinus van der Lubbe
 Marinus van der Lubbe rehabilitated (English)

1909 births
1934 deaths
People from Leiden
Dutch communists
Council communists
People condemned by Nazi courts
Executed Dutch people
Dutch people executed by Nazi Germany
Bricklayers
Dutch people executed abroad
People executed by Nazi Germany by guillotine
People convicted of arson
Reichstag building
Executed communists